Dege may refer to:
 Derge, a town in Dêgê County in Garzê Tibetan Autonomous Prefecture, Sichuan, China
 Dêgê County, in Garzê Tibetan Autonomous Prefecture, Sichuan, China
 Dege Kingdom, a former kingdom in Eastern Tibet